The 2009–10 Algerian Championnat National, referred to as the Nedjma Algerian Championnat National for sponsorship reasons, was the 48th season of the Algerian Championnat National since its establishment in 1962. A total of 18 teams contested the league, with ES Sétif as the defending champions. It started on August 6, 2009, and ended on May 31, 2010.

MC Alger were crowned champions, the seventh time in club history, on the final day of the season after a 4-0 win against MSP Batna.

Overview

Promotion and relegation 
Teams promoted from 2008-09 Algerian Championnat National 2
 CA Batna
 MC Oran
 WA Tlemcen

Teams relegated to 2009–10 Algerian Championnat National 2
 MC Saïda
 RC Kouba

Teams & Stadiums

League table

Goalscorers

Last updated: 22 August 2010; Source:

Top scorers

References

External links
 Algerian Championnat National table at Soccerway.com

Algerian Championnat National
1
Algerian Ligue Professionnelle 1 seasons